North Avenue is a major east–west street in Chicago, Illinois, and its western suburbs.  Starting at St. Charles's eastern border with West Chicago, its name changes from Main Street to North Avenue, just east of the Kane/DuPage county line.  From there, it travels straight east, carrying Illinois Route 64 until LaSalle Drive in Chicago. Illinois Route 64 then continues north onto LaSalle Drive for a very short distance until ending at U.S. Route 41 (Lake Shore Drive), while North Avenue continues east for less than one-half mile, changing its name to North Boulevard at Clark Street, and then continuing until its termination in a cul-de-sac at 200 East, just west of Lake Shore Drive.  From Illinois Route 43 (Harlem Avenue) to its east end, North Avenue is within the city limits of Chicago.

Route description
North Avenue, signed as Illinois Route 64, travels east from Main Street at the St. Charles/West Chicago border. Continuing east (while still in West Chicago), North Avenue intersects Illinois Route 59. The road then continues through suburbs such as Carol Stream and Glendale Heights. In Glendale Heights, North Avenue intersects Interstate 355 (Veterans Memorial Tollway). Just east of this interchange, the road intersects Illinois Route 53. North Avenue continues through Lombard and Addison. In Elmhurst, the street intersects Illinois Route 83 (Kingery Highway). Just west of the DuPage/Cook county line (while still in Elmhurst), the street intersects U.S. Route 20 and Interstate 290 (Eisenhower Expressway). At this interchange, North Avenue picks up U.S. Route 20. Together, the two highways cross the county line and then continue into Northlake (named after North Avenue and Lake Street). Just after this, the highways intersect Interstate 294 (Tri-State Tollway). At the eastern end of this interchange, U.S. Route 20 continues east onto Lake Street. Just east of Northlake, the road intersects U.S. Route 12/U.S. Route 45 (Mannheim Road). In the next suburb, Melrose Park, North Avenue intersects Illinois Route 171 (1st Avenue). One and one-half miles further east, North Avenue intersects Illinois Route 43 (Harlem Avenue) at the borders between River Forest (southwest), Elmwood Park (northwest), Oak Park (southeast), and Chicago (northeast). The route continues as a border between Oak Park (south) and Chicago (north) until reaching Austin Boulevard. East of this point, the rest of the route is within the city of Chicago. One and one-half miles further east, North Avenue intersects Illinois Route 50 (Cicero Avenue). North Avenue continues to intersect major streets, such as Pulaski Road, Kedzie Avenue, Western Avenue, and Milwaukee Avenue. East of Milwaukee Avenue, North Avenue has an interchange with Interstate 90/Interstate 94 (Kennedy Expressway). Next, the road intersects Elston Avenue, crosses the North Avenue Bridge and then intersects Clybourn Avenue and Halsted Street, where the North/Clybourn CTA station is located. After Wells Street, Illinois Route 64 branches off of North Avenue at LaSalle Drive, continuing north, then shortly thereafter, it turns east until ending at U.S. Route 41 (Lake Shore Drive). North Avenue continues east, intersecting Clark Street. East of Clark Street, it becomes North Boulevard, and crosses State Street and Astor Street.

History
As its name suggests, it was the northern boundary of the City of Chicago west of LaSalle Street to Wood Street upon its incorporation on March 4, 1837. (East of LaSalle, Armitage Avenue, then called Center Street, was the northern boundary.) The portion west to Western Avenue was annexed on February 14, 1851, and that west to Pulaski on the southern side February 27th, 1869. On the northern side all of the Street in the City west of Kedzie was annexed with the Town of Jefferson effective June 29th, 1889.

North Avenue, a new road in DuPage County in the late 1920s, was put through in 1928, the first forty-foot highway through the county.

Transportation
The road is mainly serviced by 72 North from Harlem Avenue to Clark Street. The N9 Ashland Owl serves the same segment the 72 does during the day east of Ashland Avenue.

The following CTA Lines service North Avenue:
Brown Line and Purple Line Express at Sedgwick Street
Red Line at Clybourn Avenue.
Blue Line at Damen and Milwaukee Avenues (auxiliary exit on North Avenue)

References

Streets in Chicago
Transportation in Cook County, Illinois
Transportation in DuPage County, Illinois
U.S. Route 20